John Kilaka (born 4 November 1966 in Sumbawanga, southwest Tanzania) is a Tanzanian writer and illustrator, best known as a creator of children's picture books.

Kilaka is an artist, storyteller and enthusiast when it comes to the collecting of old traditions and stories. When Kilaka was young he always painted and soon realized that he needed to make his way to Dar es Salaam for an education. There he got familiar with Tingatinga painting and today he is a front figure. He debuted as a book illustrator with Fresh Fish. It was a big international success as well as True Friends which received the New Horizon award at the 2004 Bologna Children's Book Fair.

In 2004, Kilaka was awarded the Peter Pan Silver Star (Peter Pans silverstjärna) for his work with Fresh Fish.
His latest book is The Amazing Tree (2009), which was translated to many languages, e.g. Swedish by Britt Isaksson under the title Förtrollad frukt. This book was also awarded the Silver Star, in 2011. All three books are fables that praise friendship.

References 

 "John Kilaka". In Anita Theorell, Afrika har ordet, Uppsala: Nordiska Afrikainstitutet, 2010, .

External links
 :sv:Peter Pans silverstjärna 
 

1966 births
Living people
Tanzanian illustrators
Tanzanian children's book illustrators
Tanzanian writers